"Down in tha Dirty" is the second single by rapper Ludacris for the unreleased Disturbing tha Peace compilation album, "Strength in Numbers". It features Bun B & Rick Ross and was produced by Clinton Sparks. The chorus, "Down in the dirty south, to be exact, gettin' money is a well known fact", is sampled from Bun B's verse on the song 'White Gurl' by E-40. The guitar is sampled from "So Wat'cha Want" by The Beastie Boys.

Chart position

References

2007 singles
2007 songs
Ludacris songs
Bun B songs
Rick Ross songs
Def Jam Recordings singles
Songs written by Ludacris
Songs written by Rick Ross
Songs written by Bun B